This article provides a list of episodes of the television series Lost in Space.

Series overview
{| class="wikitable plainrowheaders" style="text-align:center;"
|-
! scope="col" colspan="2" rowspan="2" |Season
! scope="col" rowspan="2" |Episodes
! scope="col" colspan="2" |Originally aired
|-
! scope="col" | First aired
! scope="col" | Last aired
|-
| scope="row" bgcolor="000000"|
| Pilot
| 1
| colspan=2| Unaired
|-
| scope="row" bgcolor="979797"|
| 1
| 29
| September 15, 1965
| April 27, 1966
|-
| scope="row" bgcolor="6C91FF"|
| 2
| 30
| September 14, 1966
| April 26, 1967
|-
| scope="row" bgcolor="FF6229"|
| 3
| 24
| September 6, 1967
| March 6, 1968
|}

Original pilot

Episodes

Season 1 (1965–66)
All episodes in black-and-white
{{Episode table
|background=#979797
|overall=2
|season=2
|title=21
|writer=21
|director=16
|airdate=15
|episodes=

{{Episode list
 |EpisodeNumber=1
 |EpisodeNumber2=1
 |Title=The Reluctant Stowaway
 |DirectedBy=Anton M. Leader
 |WrittenBy=S. Bar-David
 |OriginalAirDate=
 |ShortSummary=On October 16, 1997 at about 8PM ET, the Robinson family departs from Cape Kennedy, Florida in the Jupiter 2 spaceship to colonize Alpha Centauri, but Dr. Zachary Smith (Jonathan Harris), working as a saboteur for a foreign government, rigs the environmental control robot to destroy the ship's control systems within hours after take off. Events lead to Smith being trapped aboard the doomed ship, which encounters a meteor storm and veers light years off course. Soon, the robot becomes active and does further damage before it can be stopped. Later, Professor John Robinson (Guy Williams) tries to fix the ship's sensor systems but must go outside the craft to perform the repairs. He becomes untethered and his wife Maureen goes out to help him.
Guest star:  Hoke Howell (Sgt. Rogers) 
Note: This episode is the first regular pilot of the series. It was nominated in 1966 for, but did not win, an Emmy award for special effects. |LineColor=979797
}}

{{Episode list
 |EpisodeNumber=19
 |EpisodeNumber2=19
 |Title=Ghost in Space
 |DirectedBy=Don Richardson
 |WrittenBy=Peter Packer
 |OriginalAirDate=
 |ShortSummary=While drilling for fuel, Dr. Smith sets off an explosive in the wrong part of a bog and unleashes an invisible presence that begins prowling around. Later, Smith makes a ouija board and conducts a séance to contact his deceased Uncle Thaddeus. During the ceremony, the unseen force arrives and rampages around the Robinsons' camp leaving Smith believing it is the angry ghost of his uncle. When it is discovered that the entity can be trapped, and leaves behind three-toed footprints, the Professor and Major West believe it is something more real than supernatural – a dimensional creature that feeds off raw energy, and it is hungry for the Jupiter 2's vital power reserves.
 |LineColor=979797
}}

}}

Season 2 (1966–67)
All episodes in Seasons 2 and 3 filmed in color
{{Episode table
|background=#6C91FF
|overall=2
|season=2
|title=21
|writer=21
|director=16
|airdate=15
|episodes=

{{Episode list
 |EpisodeNumber=31
 |EpisodeNumber2=2
 |Title=Wild Adventure
 |DirectedBy=Don Richardson
 |WrittenBy= William Read Woodfield & Allan Balter
 |OriginalAirDate=
 |ShortSummary=Claiming he has found the way to Earth, Dr. Smith tampers with the navigation controls and inadvertently dumps all the Jupiter 2s reserve fuel supply. The Professor locates an Earth fuel barge where they refuel. Meanwhile, Smith, who has changed the ship's course back to Earth again by coopting Penny to do it for him, begins to see a beautiful, green-skinned woman floating outside the viewports who sings his name, but no one believes his wild story. When an alarm sounds, they discover they are headed directly at the Sun, and pulling away depletes their fuel, leaving them with no choice but to head to nearby Earth. The girl lures Smith outside the ship. With the little fuel they have left from the barge, hope is shattered when the family is forced to make the decision to save Dr. Smith and miss their chance of returning to Earth. They have a very brief radio contact with Alpha Control, which cannot aid them.Guest star:' Vitina Marcus (Lorelei – Her name is changed to Athena when she returns in "The Girl from the Green Dimension").
 |LineColor=6C91FF
}}

}}

Season 3 (1967–68)

DVD and Blu-ray Releases
Complete box sets of all 3 seasons (and the original pilot film) of the original TV series have been released on DVD in South America, North America, Europe, and Australia.

The following DVD sets have been released by 20th Century Fox.

All episodes of Lost in Space'' were remastered and released on a Blu-ray disc set on September 15, 2015 (the 50th anniversary of the premiere on the CBS TV Network).

On February 5, 2019, all episodes (cropped to 16:9 widescreen from the Blu-ray masters) were re-released on a DVD disc set.

References

Lost in Space
Lost in Space